The Ultra DMA (Ultra Direct Memory Access, UDMA) modes were the fastest method used to transfer data through the ATA hard disk interface, usually between the  computer and an ATA device. UDMA succeeded Single/Multiword DMA as the interface of choice between ATA devices and the computer. There are eight different UDMA modes, ranging from 0 to 6 for ATA (0 to 7 for CompactFlash), each with its own timing.

Modes faster than UDMA mode 2 require an 80-conductor cable to reduce data settling times, lower impedance and reduce crosstalk.

See also 
 PIO—The first interface type used between devices (mainly hard disks) and the computer.
 Parallel ATA
 Serial ATA

References

AT Attachment